Primera Hora (First Hour) is a name of the following Spanish language newspapers:
Primera Hora (Puerto Rico)
Primera Hora (Mexico) in Mexico